The Twin Bridges Motor Hotel, later known as the Twin Bridges Marriott was the first lodging facility operated by what would become Marriott International. It opened on about January 18, 1957, shortly before the second inauguration of President Dwight D. Eisenhower, and was demolished in 1990.

Operation as a motor hotel

The motel was located in Arlington, Virginia, at the Virginia approaches to the 14th Street Bridge, almost directly across the Potomac River from the Jefferson Memorial in the District of Columbia.  From this position it had views of the U.S. Capitol and Washington Monument. Its address was 333 Jefferson Davis Highway, Arlington, Virginia. The motel was highly visible and under the aerial approaches to National Airport.

At its opening, the motel comprised 365 rooms, each with two double beds and a black and white television set. Originally designed as a classic motel with six two-story buildings with exterior entrances, within a few years a 100-room addition of a 5-story tower was added with space for restaurants, meeting rooms, and a rooftop lounge. A new lobby was added, along with a swimming pool that could be converted to an ice rink in the winter. Original rates were $8 per night plus $1 for each person, with a maximum charge of $12. Check-in was outside so the clerk could see how many were in the guests' car. Clerks would then escort the guests to their room by bicycle.

Because the Marriott Hotel chain did not yet exist, the hotel was operated as a Quality Courts motel (the precursor to Choice Hotels) for the first few years. Quality Courts was based in Washington, D.C., as well. With the construction of the Key Bridge Marriott Hotel just a few miles up the road in 1959, the moniker Marriott Motor Hotels was applied to both hotels.

Its proximity to The Pentagon and the airport allowed it to profit from both. Bill Marriott later claimed that it was "one of the very first airport hotels in the country."

On June 29, 1979, American musician Lowell George suffered a fatal heart attack while staying at the hotel.

Closure and demolition
The motel permanently closed for business on December 18, 1988. After its demolition in 1990, the Arlington County government rejected a 1991 proposal for office redevelopment, then in 1994 approved an office-and-hotel plan that was never built. In 1993, the Department of the Army attempted to obtain the land for a proposed military history museum. In 2005 the County Board refused to grant permission for two seven-story office buildings on the site (and an adjacent parcel at 355 Old Jefferson Davis Memorial Highway). Instead, the County organized an exchange of parcels that shifted the private development closer to Crystal City and secured the Twin Bridges property for public uses more in accord with its visual prominence and sensitive location. The site has been developed as a public recreation area as part of Arlington County's Long Bridge Park.

See also

 List of motels

References

Buildings and structures demolished in 1990
Marriott hotels
Motels in the United States
Demolished buildings and structures in Virginia
Defunct hotels in Virginia
Demolished hotels in the United States